() is a non-governmental and non-profit, voluntary organisation founded in 1965 by Maltese Judge Maurice Caruana Curran to safeguard Malta's cultural heritage and natural environment. Since its foundation, Din l-Art Ħelwa has restored numerous cultural sites of historic and environmental importance.  The organisation promotes the preservation and protection of historic buildings and monuments, the character of Malta's towns and villages, and places of natural beauty.  They stimulate the enforcement of existing laws and the enactment of new ones for the protection of Malta's natural and built heritage.

Name and offices
The name of the organization is derived from the first verse of L-Innu Malti, Malta's national anthem: "Lil din l-art ħelwa..." (This fair land). Letter Ħ is part of Maltese alphabet.

The offices of Din l-Art Ħelwa are found at 133 Melita Street, Valletta. The building is part of a large townhouse located at 130-135, Melita Street (formerly Strada Britannica). In 1816, part of the house belonged to Maria Stivala. The property was later owned by Antonio Giappone, and then owned by Giuseppe Apap.

Properties managed

Din l-Art Ħelwa has the following properties under its care in Malta:
Part of Palazzo Nobile, the head office of the organization
Foresta 2000, a forestation site in Mellieħa
Wignacourt Tower, St Paul's Bay
Saint Mark's Tower, Baħar iċ-Ċagħaq
Msida Bastion Historic Garden, Floriana
Mamo Tower, Marsaskala
Għallis Tower, Salina, Naxxar
Saint Agatha's Tower (the Red Tower), Mellieħa
Delimara Lighthouse, Delimara
Chapel of the Annunciation, Ħal-Millieri, Żurrieq
St. John the Evangelist Chapel, Ħal-Millieri, Żurrieq
Chapel of St Roque, Żebbuġ
Chapel of Bir Miftuħ
The Church of Our Lady of Victory in Valletta

The Xutu Tower in Qrendi, Wied Iż-Żurrieq

Din l-Art Ħelwa has the following property under its care in Gozo:
Dwejra Tower
Saint Anthony's Battery

Din l-Art Ħelwa has the following properties under its care in Comino:
Saint Mary's Tower
Saint Mary's Battery

References

External links
 Din l-Art Ħelwa website

Malta
History organisations based in Malta
1965 establishments in Malta
Organizations established in 1965
Heritage organizations